, a.k.a. Remon Hanazawa, is a Japanese pink film actress who has also performed in adult videos (AV). She has appeared in award-winning pink films such as Lunch Box (2004) and Molester's Train: Sensitive Fingers (2007). She was named "Best New Actress" for her work in this genre in 2004, and "Best Actress" second place in 2005 at the Pink Grand Prix. The Kansai region Pinky Ribbon Awards chose Hanazawa for Best Supporting Actress in 2005, and Outstanding Performance by an Actress in 2007.

Career 
Hanazawa began working in adult videos at least as early as December 2003 when she took part in the "train molester" video  for the  studio. In May 2004, she appeared with Sakura Sakurada in the lesbian-themed  for the Moodyz studio and has also performed in a number of other adult videos for various studios.

Hanazawa made her pink film debut in Shinji Imaoka's Lunch Box (March 2004), which was selected as Best Film at the 2004 Pink Grand Prix. In the film, Hanazawa plays the role of one of star Yumika Hayashi's co-workers and sexual rivals. Her performance in this film earned her a "Best New Actress" award at the 2004 Pink Grand Prix, beating popular AV idol Sora Aoi, who had also made her pink film debut that year. During 2004 Hanazawa performed in 20 of these theatrical pink film releases. Her performance in Akira Katō's Teacher with Beautiful Skin: Big Tit Vibe-Torture (2005), earned her the Best Actress, 2nd place award at the 2005 Pink Grand Prix ceremony.

In his book Behind the Pink Curtain: The Complete History of Japanese Sex Cinema, Jasper Sharp uses one of Hanazawa's scenes in Yutaka Ikejima's Family Gets Rude Chapter 1: Perverts' Fun (2004) to illustrate the creative means pink film directors employ to suggest more than is legally possible in Japanese softcore pornography. Hanazawa masturbates in a scene that Sharp characterizes as "pretty lewd", yet she is seen only in soft focus in the background. The foreground focus of the camera is a bouquet of flowers, behind which the masturbating Hanazawa moans, "Look at my flower!"

Besides Imaoka and Ikejima, other major pink film directors in whose films Hanazawa has appeared include Toshiki Satō (Tokyo Booty Nights, 2004), Tetsuya Takehora (Peep Show, 2004), Yumi Yoshiyuki, Sachi Hamano, and Yoshikazu Katō. Katō's Molester's Train: Sensitive Fingers (2007) gave Hanazawa a second appearance in a Pink Grand Prix Best Film-winner. The film was also given the Gold Prize at the Pinky Ribbon Awards.

Hanazawa also appeared with Kyōko Kazama, Akiho Yoshizawa and Mihiro in the Edo period historical costume drama, The Inner Palace: Indecent War, in July 2006. A sequel The Inner Palace: Flower of War came out in August of the same year. The two videos were released by AV studio Max-A in hardcore versions under their DoraMax label and also shorter softcore R-15 rated versions for the Pure Max label.

In February 2008, Hanazawa had a supporting role in the mainstream horror film Rika: The Zombie Killer starring Risa Kudō. The movie, described by one reviewer as an "outrageously silly film", was released on DVD with English subtitles in September 2009. Hanazawa was one of several colleagues and friends who appeared in Korean-Japanese director Tetsuaki Matsue's 2009 documentary on Yumika Hayashi, .

Partial filmography

Bibliography

English

Japanese

References

 
|-
! colspan="3" style="background: #DAA520;" | Pink Grand Prix
|-

|-
! colspan="3" style="background: #DAA520;" | Pinky Ribbon Awards
|-

|-

1984 births
Japanese pornographic film actresses
Japanese film actresses
Pink film actors
Living people
People from Hyōgo Prefecture